The Australasian Journal of Bone & Joint Medicine (originally titled the Australasian Journal of Musculoskeletal Medicine) was a periodical presented in the style of a scientific journal, published by Elsevier but established and funded by pharmaceutical company Merck. Publication began in 2002, and the last issue appeared in 2005. According to The Scientist:

The publication was not included in the MEDLINE literature database and did not have its own website.

In May 2009, Elsevier admitted that a series of similar industry sponsored publications had been produced, and that "high standards for disclosure were not followed in this instance". In a formal statement, the CEO of Elsevier's Health Sciences Division, Michael Hansen, admitted that the practice was "unacceptable", and expressed regret for the publications. Merck has denied claims that articles within it were ghost written by Merck and has stated that the articles were all reprinted from peer-reviewed medical journals.

Several medical experts stated that their names were included in the Honorary Editorial Board of the Australasian Journal of Bone and Joint Medicine without their knowledge and consent.

There were six such "industry-sponsored" publications brought out by Elsevier without proper disclosure of their nature, and which had the superficial appearance of a legitimate independent journal. The six publications involved were:
 Australasian Journal of General Practice
 Australasian Journal of Neurology
 Australasian Journal of Cardiology
 Australasian Journal of Clinical Pharmacy
 Australasian Journal of Cardiovascular Medicine
 Australasian Journal of Bone & Joint Medicine

See also
 Academic dishonesty
 Elsevier#Fake journals
 Vioxx

References

External links
 Volume 2 (2003), Issue 1
 Volume 2 (2003), Issue 2

Ethics of science and technology
Elsevier academic journals
Publications established in 2002
Publications disestablished in 2005
Orthopedics journals
English-language journals
2002 establishments in Australia